Édouard Desplechin  (12 April 1802 – 10 December 1871), was a 19th-century French scenic designer, one of the most famous of his time.

Biography

He created numerous settings for grands opéras and theatre plays of the romantic era, and closely collaborated with great composers such as Meyerbeer, Verdi, Gounod and Wagner.

His workshop was taken over by Eugène Carpezat and Jean-Baptiste Lavastre.

Students 

 Jean-Baptiste Lavastre (1839–1891).

References

Bibliography 
 Jean-Maxime Levêque, Édouard Desplechin, le décorateur du grand opéra à la française (1802-1871), L’Harmattan, collection « Univers musical », 2008, 198 p. 

French scenic designers
Artists from Lille
1802 births
1871 deaths